KZKY (104.5 FM) is a radio station licensed to Ucon, Idaho, United States. The station is owned by Rich Broadcasting, through licensee Rich Broadcasting Idaho LS, LLC.

On February 3, 2012, KZKY signed on the air with a classic rock format, simulcasting KPKY 94.9 FM Pocatello, Idaho.

References

External links

ZKY
Radio stations established in 2008
2008 establishments in Idaho